Wisse Dekker (26 April 1924 – 25 August 2012) was a Dutch businessman. He was the CEO of Philips from 1982 to 1986. From 1988 until 1992 he was chairman of the European Round Table of Industrialists.

References

1924 births
2012 deaths
Chairmen of Philips
Dutch chief executives in the manufacturing industry
Dutch chief executives in the technology industry
Dutch businesspeople
Dutch corporate directors
People from Eindhoven
Road incident deaths in the Netherlands
Recipients of the Order of Merit of Baden-Württemberg